Anahat (or Anahata) may refer to:
 Anahat (film), a Marathi film by director Amol Palekar
 Anahat Yoga, a type of Yoga
 Anahat Chakra, the fourth primary chakra according to the Hindu Yogic and Tantric (Shakta) traditions